The year 2018 is the 8th year in the history of the Fight Nights Global, a mixed martial arts promotion based in Russia. The company continues broadcasts through Match TV, Fight Network and is looking for a new US-based platform since the contract with UFC Fight Pass has been terminated.

List of events

Fight Nights Global 83: Alibekov vs. Aliev

Fight Nights Global 83: Alibekov vs. Aliev was a mixed martial arts event held by Fight Nights Global on February 22, 2018 at the Luzhniki Palace of Sports (SCCH "Rossiya") in Moscow, Russia.

Background
This event will feature two world title fights, first for the Fight Nights Global Lightweight Championship between the champion Magomedsaygid Alibekov and Akhmed Aliev as Fight Nights Global 83 headliner, and for the inaugural Fight Nights Global Women's Bantamweight Championship between Marina Mokhnatkina  and Liana Jojua as co-headliner.

The event will also feature the debut of Dominique Steele with Fight Nights Global organisation against Nikolay Aleksakhin and the return of Khabib Nurmagomedov cousin Umar Nurmagomedov against the cousin of Featherweight standout Goiti Yamauchi, the Brazilian Shyudi Yamauchi.

Results

Fight Nights Global 84: Deák vs. Chupanov

Fight Nights Global 84: Deák vs. Chupanov was a mixed martial arts event held by Fight Nights Global on March 2, 2018 at the Hant Arena in Bratislava, Slovakia.

Background

Results

Fight Nights Global 85: Alikhanov vs. Kopylov

Fight Nights Global 85: Alikhanov vs. Kopylov was a mixed martial arts event held by Fight Nights Global on March 30, 2018 at the VTB Ice Palace in Moscow, Russia.

Background
This event featured two world title fights, first for the Fight Nights Global Middleweight Championship between the champion Abusupyan Alikhanov and the challenger Roman Kopylov as Fight Nights Global 85 headliner, and for the interim Fight Nights Global Welterweight Championship between Aliaskhab Khizriev and Rousimar Palhares as co-headliner.

The card was originally co-headlined by a title fight between champion Alexander Matmuratov and challenger Movlid Khaibulaev for the Fight Nights Global Featherweight Championship. On March 28, it was announced Khaibulaev had to withdraw due to an injury, the fight was canceled.

Vladimir Mineev was injured during his preparation for the against Magomed Ismailov. Mineev is out due to lateral ligament rupture, the bout has been temporarily postponed. Ildemar Alcântara stepped in on short notice to face Ismailov.

Results

Fight Nights Global 86: Nam vs. Zhumagulov

Fight Nights Global 86: Nam vs. Zhumagulov was a mixed martial arts event held by Fight Nights Global on April 1, 2018 at the Almaty Arena in Almaty, Kazakhstan.

Background

Results

Fight Nights Global 87: Khachatryan vs. Queally

Fight Nights Global 87: Khachatryan vs. Queally was a mixed martial arts event held by Fight Nights Global on May 19, 2018 in Rostov-on-Don, Russia.

Background

Results

Fight Nights Global: Summer Cup 2018

Fight Nights Global: Summer Cup 2018 was a mixed martial arts event held by Fight Nights Global on June 30, 2018 in Bozhou, China.

Background

Results

Fight Nights Global 88

Fight Nights Global 88 was a mixed martial arts event held by Fight Nights Global on August 31, 2018 at the Alau Arena in Astana, Kazakhstan.

Background

Results

Fight Nights Global 89

Fight Nights Global 89 was a mixed martial arts event held by Fight Nights Global on September 8, 2018 in Bozhou, China.

Background

Results

Fight Nights Global 90: Mineev vs. Ismailov

Fight Nights Global 90: Mineev vs. Ismailov was a mixed martial arts event held by Fight Nights Global on October 19, 2018 in Moscow.

Background

Results

Fight Nights Global 91

Fight Nights Global 91 was a mixed martial arts event held by Fight Nights Global on December 27, 2018 in Moscow.

Background

Results

References

Fight Nights Global events
2018 in mixed martial arts
AMC Fight Nights